This is a list of provinces, dioceses, archbishops and bishops  in the Church of Nigeria, Anglican Communion, in 2021.

The church has 14 Provinces in Nigeria, each with an Archbishop. Each Province is divided into dioceses; there were 161 dioceses in Nigeria, each with a bishop. Each Archbishop is also the bishop of one of the dioceses in his Province.

The pre-eminent Archbishop, The Primate of All Nigeria, is chosen from the 14 Archbishops, and becomes Bishop of Abuja.

The Primate is Henry Ndukuba, elected in 2020.

Archbishops in the Church of Nigeria

Bishops in the Church of Nigeria 

The 161 diocesan bishops are listed below.

References 

Nigeria religion-related lists
Lists of Anglican bishops and archbishops